Kandar-e Kolah Boland (also Romanized as Kandar-e Kolāh Boland and Kondor Kolah Boland) is a village in Sigar Rural District, in the Central District of Lamerd County, Fars Province, Iran. At the 2006 census, its population was 297, in 63 families.

References 

Populated places in Lamerd County